Camille Lefèvre (1853–1933) was a French sculptor.

Biography 

Born in Issy-les-Moulineaux, in 1870 Lefèvre became a pupil of Jules Cavelier at the École nationale supérieure des Beaux-Arts in Paris.  In 1878, he won the second Prix de Rome in sculpture. In 1893 he exhibited at the Chicago World Fair . In 1900 he became a member of the New Society of Painters and Sculptors in 1901 and is made a Knight of the Legion of Honour. From 1903 to 1906 he was professor at the National School of Decorative Arts.

Throughout his career, Lefevre remained concerned with social issues, participating in charitable works and maintaining relations with the middle left-liberal among artists as Eugène Carrière and journalist Jules Lermina.

Among his students was the American sculptor Frederick Ruckstull.  At his death, his collections and his studio was bequeathed to the museum of art and history of Belfort. Other works are kept at the Musée d'Orsay and in provincial museums.

Work 

 Monument to Emile Levassor in the Square Alexandre-and-René-Parodi
 Pediment of the Crédit Lyonnais headquarters, Paris (1880–1883)
 The Ford, marble (1884), installed in 1942 in the gardens of Sainte-Anne Hospital in Paris
 allegorical figure of Painting (1900), the Grand Palais, Paris
 Triumph of the Republic (1902), Issy-les-Moulineaux
 completion of the Monument to Léon Gambetta (1905), posthumous work of Jules Dalou
 completion of the Monument Levassor (1907), posthumous work of Dalou, at the Porte Maillot in Paris.
 architectural sculpture for the Gare de Rouen-Rive-Droite (1928)

 This page translated from its French equivalent accessed 4/22/2011

External links
 

1853 births
1933 deaths
French architectural sculptors
Prix de Rome for sculpture
École des Beaux-Arts alumni
Chevaliers of the Légion d'honneur
19th-century French sculptors
French male sculptors
20th-century French sculptors
People from Issy-les-Moulineaux
19th-century French male artists